Blaxlands Corner is a locality on the North Shore of Sydney in the state of New South Wales, Australia. Blaxlands Corner is at the intersection of Longueville Road, Northwood Road, and River Road West, in the southern part of Lane Cove adjacent to Longueville. It contains the Longueville Sporting Club, a BP service station, a bottle shop, a travel and cruise agency. Longueville Motor Bus Company built a depot at 16 Northwood Road in 1939 that was closed by successor Deanes Coaches in the mid-1970s.

It was named after Francis Blaxland who owned three acres of land in the area from the 1880s and was a grandson of Gregory Blaxland. It was recognised by the Geographical Names Board of New South Wales as a locality in 1995.

References

Lane Cove Council
Sydney localities